Erynnis is a genus in the skippers butterfly family Hesperiidae, known as the duskywings. Erynnis is found in the Neotropical realm and across the Palearctic, but the highest species diversity is in the Nearctic. The genus was erected by Franz von Paula Schrank in 1801.

Species and notable subspecies
Listed alphabetically:
Erynnis afranius (Lintner, 1878) – Afranius duskywing
Erynnis baptisiae (Forbes, 1936) – wild indigo duskywing
Erynnis brizo (Boisduval & LeConte, [1837]) – sleepy duskywing
Erynnis brizo burgessi (Skinner, 1914) – Rocky Mountain sleepy duskywing
Erynnis funeralis (Scudder & Burgess, 1870) – funereal duskywing
Erynnis horatius (Scudder & Burgess, 1870) – Horace's duskywing
Erynnis icelus (Scudder & Burgess, 1870) – dreamy duskywing
Erynnis juvenalis (Fabricius, 1793) – Juvenal's duskywing
Erynnis lucilius (Scudder & Burgess, 1870) – columbine duskywing
Erynnis martialis (Scudder, 1869) – mottled duskywing
Erynnis marloyi (Boisduval, [1834]) – inky skipper
Erynnis mercurius (Dyar, 1926) Mexico
Erynnis montana (Bremer, 1861) South China, Formosa, Amur, Japan
Erynnis meridianus Bell, 1927 – meridian duskywing – California, Nevada, Arizona, New Mexico
Erynnis pacuvius (Lintner, [1878]) – Pacuvius duskywing, Dyar's duskywing, or buckthorn dusky wing
Erynnis pacuvius callidus (Grinnell, 1905) – Californian – Pacuvius duskywing
Erynnis pathan Evans, 1949 Ghissar, Chitral, North Baluchistan
Erynnis pelias (Leech, 1891) West China, Arunachal Pradesh
Erynnis persius (Scudder, 1863) – Persius duskywing or hairy duskywing
Erynnis persius fredericki (H. A. Freeman, 1943) – eastern Persius duskywing
Erynnis popoviana Nordmann, 1851 Mongolia, North China, East China, Central China, Ussuri
Erynnis propertius (Scudder & Burgess, 1870) – Propertius duskywing or western oak duskywing
Erynnis scudderi (Skinner, 1914) – Scudder's duskywing – Mexico, Arizona
Erynnis tages (Linnaeus, 1758) – dingy skipper
Erynnis telemachus Burns, 1960 – Rocky Mountain duskywing – Arizona
Erynnis tristis (Boisduval 1852) – mournful duskywing – Arizona, California, New Mexico, Texas, Mexico to Colombia, Central America
Erynnis tristis tatius (W. H. Edwards, 1882) – Tatius duskywing – Arizona, Mexico, Guatemala, Costa Rica, Panama, to Colombia
Erynnis zarucco (H. Lucas, 1857) – zarucco duskywing

References

External links 

Canadian Biodiversity Information Facility
Species records from University of Colorado Museum
Northeastern Mexico Butterfly List
Images representing Erynnis at Consortium for the Barcode of Life
 Distribution